William Twaits (August 20, 1879 – April 13, 1941) was a Canadian amateur soccer player who competed in the 1904 Summer Olympics. Twaits was born in Galt, Ontario. In 1904 he was a member of the Galt F.C. team, which won the gold medal in the soccer tournament. He played all two matches as a forward.

References

External links
 
profile

1879 births
1941 deaths
Canadian soccer players
Canadian people of British descent
Association football forwards
Footballers at the 1904 Summer Olympics
Olympic gold medalists for Canada
Olympic soccer players of Canada
Soccer people from Ontario
Sportspeople from Cambridge, Ontario
Olympic medalists in football
Medalists at the 1904 Summer Olympics